Крылья (Kryla) ("Wings") is the fourth full-length album by the Russian power metal band Catharsis. It was released on March 25, 2005, by Irond.

Track listing
 Увертюра (Ouvertyura)  – 2:30 - Overture (instrumental)
 Кто ты? (Kto ty?)  – 4:28 - Who Are You? 
 Hold Fast  – 3:44 
 Крылья (Kryl'ya)  – 5:04 - Wings
 Наш путь (Nash put')  – 4:01 - Our Way 
 Зов зверя (Zov zverya)  – 4:19 - Call of the Beast
 Талисман (Talisman)  – 3:46 
 Madre  – 4:11 
 Страж времён (Strazh vremyon)  – 5:34 - The Guard of Time
 Помни меня (Pomni menya)  – 4:29 - Remember Me
 Симфония огня (Simfoniya ognya)  – 5:57 - The Symphony of Fire
 Песнь луны (Pesn' luny)  – 3:45 - The Song of the Moon (instrumental)

Members 
Oleg Zhilyakov - vocals, back vocals
Igor 'Jeff' Polyakov - rhythm Guitar, acoustic Guitar
Oleg Mission - lead guitar, acoustic guitar, flute, keyboards, back vocals
Julia Red - keyboards
Andrey Ischenko - drums
Alexander Timonin - bass

2005 albums
Catharsis (Russian band) albums